H. Mitchell may refer to:

 Harlan Erwin Mitchell (1924–2011), U.S. Representative from Georgia
 H. Mitchell (Hampshire cricketer), English cricketer